Rosemary Anne Leonard (born 22 July 1956) MBE MA MB BChir MRCGP DRCOG is a British general practitioner and journalist.

Biography
Leonard was born in London; she went to the girls' grammar school Dr Challoner's High School in Little Chalfont. She then went to the all-female Newnham College, Cambridge where she graduated with double first-class honours, before completing her training at St Thomas's Hospital Medical School.

Leonard is a GP in Dulwich, South London. She has written for national newspapers and magazines, including Hello!, The Sun, the Daily Mail and the Daily Express since 1986. She has been the resident GP for BBC Breakfast News since 1998. She was a member of the Committee on Safety of Medicines and a Non-executive Director of the Health Protection Agency.

Leonard has two sons.

Work associated with the tobacco industry 
Leonard served as a Commissioner on a report funded by the Foundation for a Smoke-Free World.  The foundation is, in turn, funded by tobacco company Philip Morris International.

Books 
Leonard has written several books, mainly drawing on experiences from her professional life, these include:

 The Seven Ages of Woman 
 Doctor, Doctor 
 Doctor's Notes

Awards and honours
 She was awarded an MBE for services to healthcare in the New Year's Honours List 2004.

See also
 List of doctors working in the British media

References

External links 
Leonard's website

1956 births
Living people
20th-century English medical doctors
20th-century British women writers
20th-century British non-fiction writers
21st-century English medical doctors
21st-century British women writers
Alumni of Newnham College, Cambridge
BBC people
British women medical doctors
English journalists
People educated at Dr Challoner's High School
Writers from London
Members of the Order of the British Empire
20th-century women physicians
21st-century women physicians